The 1996 Boise State Broncos football team represented Boise State University in the 1996 NCAA Division I-A football season, their first in Division I-A.  The Broncos competed in the Big West Conference and played their home games on campus at Bronco Stadium in Boise, Idaho. Led by fourth-year head coach Pokey Allen and interim head coach Tom Mason, Boise State finished the season at 2–10 (1–4 in Big West, fifth).

Diagnosed with a rare and aggressive muscle cancer (rhabdomyosarcoma) shortly after the 1994 season, Allen underwent surgery in August 1996, then returned to coach the final two games of the season. While visiting relatives in Montana over the holidays, Allen's condition worsened and he died in Missoula on December 30.

Schedule

References

Boise State
Boise State Broncos football seasons
Boise State Broncos football